Bharti Infratel Limited is a telecommunications infrastructure company that provides telecom infrastructure such as telecom towers fiber networks and other related infrastructure to Bharti Airtel and other telecommunications companies in India. It is India's largest consolidated tower infrastructure companies, and its largest customers are Bharti Airtel and Vodafone Idea and Reliance Jio. Bharti Infratel was the first Indian company to start a tower infrastructure sharing business and today Bharti Infratel is the market leader in this segment. The company has a 42% equity stake in Indus towers which was created as a joint venture between Bharti Airtel and the now merged Vodafone Idea and operates over 42,053 individual telecom towers across 11 telecom circles all over India.

As of 2020, the company's revenues stood at ₹6,871.70 crore (US$960 million) while its total assets stood at ₹20,158.80 crores (US$2.8 billion). The company is currently owned by Bharti Airtel (33.57%) and Nettle Infrastructure Investments Limited (19.94%). Nettle Infrastructure Investments Limited is a wholly-owned subsidiary of Bharti Airtel thus making Airtel the parent company with a 53.51% combined stake.

The company used to be in the NIFTY 50 index. In September 2020, Divi's Laboratories and SBI Life Insurance Company replaced Bharti Infratel (Indus Towers) and Zee Entertainment Enterprises on the Nifty 50 index.

Indus Towers merger 
A merger between Bharti Infratel and Indus Towers had been proposed as per a deal in April 2018 and was initially planned to go through before October 2019. However, due to delays in approvals, it was postponed to December 2019 by when the Department of Telecommunications was supposed to give its permission. Owing to further delays by the DOT and the National Company Law Tribunal the deadline was extended multiple times to 24 June. After the merger Vodafone Idea is reportedly going to divest its stake in the entity. The merger received FDI approval and is now due to be completed by 31 August. Post merger the combined entity is reported to become the second largest telecom tower infrastructure operator worldwide.

References  

2007 establishments in Haryana
Telecommunications companies of India
Indian companies established in 2007
Bharti Airtel
Companies based in Gurgaon
Companies listed on the National Stock Exchange of India
Companies listed on the Bombay Stock Exchange